Nanta (also known as Cookin or Cookin' Nanta) is a South Korean non-verbal comedy show created and produced by Song Seung-whan and incorporates traditional samul nori rhythm. It premiered in October 1997 in Hoam Art Hall in Seoul.

Features

The musical has a simple back story of three cooks attempting to finish preparing a wedding banquet within a strict time limit while the manager installs his incompetent nephew among the kitchen staff. The show involves acrobatics, magic tricks, comedy, pantomime and audience participation. The unifying element throughout the musical is the use of traditional Korean samul nori music, which in this case is performed with improvised instruments, such as cutting boards, water canisters and kitchen knives. The performance is almost completely non-verbal. The very few words which are spoken are mostly in English.

Popularity
Nanta is the longest-running show in Korean history. In Korea, it has two private theaters in Seoul(Myeong-dong, Hongdae), one on the island of Jeju, the other in Bangkok, Thailand. The musical made its international debut at the 1999 Edinburgh Festival Fringe, where it received an award for best performance. Since then it has been staged in 57 countries around the world. Nanta opened Off-Broadway in New York City in 2004 and ended its run in August 2005. In March 2017, Hotel Nanta opened in Jeju island.

See also
Myeong-dong
Samulnori
Hongdae, Seoul
Performance

References

External links
Nanta Website
Nanta: Official Seoul City Tourism
Nanta Facebook

Percussion music
Instrumental music
Works about chefs
Works about cooking
Works about wedding
Performing arts in South Korea
1997 works
South Korean comedy
Nonverbal communication